Lilburn Ray Harper Jr. (born October 11, 1961) is an American college basketball coach, currently head coach for Jacksonville State University. Previously, he was head coach at Oklahoma City University, Kentucky Wesleyan College, and Western Kentucky University. At Kentucky Wesleyan Harper compiled a 242–45 win–loss record.

He has been named the Division II National Coach of the Year seven times and won two national titles at Kentucky Wesleyan in 1999 and 2001.

Harper was named interim head coach at Western Kentucky on January 6, 2012 after Ken McDonald was fired. He was named permanent head coach on February 19, 2012 by then-athletic director Ross Bjork. He resigned from the position on March 17, 2016 following the permanent suspension of three of his players. Harper was subsequently hired at Jacksonville State on April 6, 2016, where he took the 2016–17 team to the school's first NCAA appearance.

Born in Greenville, Kentucky and a native of Bremen, Kentucky, Harper played collegiately at the University of Texas as a freshman and at Kentucky Wesleyan, during his sophomore-senior seasons, where he was named third team NABC All-American as a senior in 1985.

He is married to Shannon Harper, a WKU alumna.

Head coaching record

* 20 wins and 5 losses were vacated from the 2003–04 season and for the 2002–03 season; the school had to vacate the NCAA Division II runner-up and conference regular season championship.

References

1961 births
Living people
American men's basketball coaches
American men's basketball players
Basketball coaches from Kentucky
Basketball players from Kentucky
College men's basketball head coaches in the United States
Jacksonville State Gamecocks men's basketball coaches
Kentucky Wesleyan Panthers men's basketball coaches
Kentucky Wesleyan Panthers men's basketball players
Oklahoma City Stars men's basketball coaches
People from Greenville, Kentucky
Texas Longhorns men's basketball players
Western Kentucky Hilltoppers basketball coaches